

Events

January events 
 January 28 – Groundbreaking commences to begin construction of the Cincinnati Subway.

March events 
 March 1 – Control of American railroads is returned to private ownership and administration with the disbandment of the USRA.
 March 18 – Fruit Growers Express (FGE) is incorporated in the United States.

April events 
 April 1 – Deutsche Reichseisenbahnen merges the German state railways.

May events 
 May 15 – The Ministry of Railways of Japan is established.

June events 
 June 13 – Baltimore and Ohio Railroad inaugurates passenger service to Detroit's Fort Street Union Depot as the first passenger train departs for Washington, DC.

July events 
 July 5 – Portland–Lewiston Interurban carries its heaviest passenger load with trains to the Maine Statehood Centennial Exposition.

October events 
 October 1 – Palestine Railways established to manage lines within British Mandatory Palestine, including the Jezreel Valley railway.

November events
 November – H. P. M. Beames succeeds Charles Bowen-Cooke as Chief Mechanical Engineer of the London and North Western Railway.
 November 20 – Work begins on the State Railway of Thailand to convert all  track to meter gauge.

December events
 December 23 – The Kirkenes–Bjørnevatn Line in Norway takes electric traction into use.

Unknown date events
 William Sproule succeeds Julius Kruttschnitt as president of the Southern Pacific Company, parent company of the Southern Pacific Railroad. This is Sproule's second term as president.
 Government of India accepts recommendation of Sir William Acworth's East India Railway Committee that the government should take over management of the country's railways.
 Partition of the Ottoman Empire leads to abandonment of the Hejaz railway.

Births

April births 
 April 16 – Alan Pegler, British railway preservationist (died 2012).
 April 17 – James B. McCahey, Jr., president of Chicago South Shore and South Bend Railroad (died 1998).

Deaths

July deaths
 July 22 – William Kissam Vanderbilt, heir to Cornelius Vanderbilt and president of the New York Central system (born 1849).

October deaths
 October 18 – Charles Bowen-Cooke, Chief Mechanical Engineer of the London and North Western Railway 1909–1920 (born 1859).

November deaths 
 November 17 – T. Jefferson Coolidge, president of Atchison, Topeka and Santa Fe Railway 1880–1881 (born 1831).

December deaths 
 December 1 – Edward Ponsonby, 8th Earl of Bessborough, director of London, Brighton and South Coast Railway from 1895 and chairman of same from 1908 (born 1851).

See also 
 List of rail accidents (1920–1929)

References